The Jokake School for Girls was a ranch school in Scottsdale, Arizona. It operated from 1933 to 1945. It housed 40 students each year it was in existence.
It was connected to the Jokake Inn, a guest ranch and winter hotel built by architect Robert Evans and backing out onto Camelback Mountain. The inn opened in 1927.

See also

 The Little Outfit Schoolhouse

References

1933 establishments in Arizona
1945 disestablishments in Arizona
Defunct girls' schools in the United States
Defunct schools in Arizona
Educational institutions established in 1933
Educational institutions disestablished in 1945
Ranch schools
Girls' schools in Arizona
History of Scottsdale, Arizona